Flight from Death (2003) is a documentary film that investigates the relationship of human violence to fear of death, as related to subconscious influences. The film describes death anxiety as a possible root cause of many human behaviors on a psychological, spiritual, and cultural level. It was directed by Patrick Shen, produced by Greg Bennick, and narrated by Gabriel Byrne.

Summary
The film's purpose is to investigate humankind's relationship with death, and is heavily influenced by the views of cultural anthropologist Ernest Becker's The Denial of Death. In addition to interviews with a number of contemporary philosophers, psychiatrists and teachers such as Sam Keen, Robert Jay Lifton, Irvin Yalom, Merlyn Mowrey and Daniel Liechty, the film introduces the viewer to a group of social psychologists, who conduct research in support of what they call terror management theory (terror in this case not being terrorism, but rather emotional and psychological reaction to mortality awareness). Over the last twenty-five years, proponents of terror management theory have conducted over 300 laboratory studies demonstrating that subtle reminders of death on a subconscious level motivates a statistically significant number of subjects to exhibit biased and xenophobic type behaviors, such as gravitating toward those who they perceive as culturally similar to themselves and holding higher negative feelings and judgments toward those they perceive as culturally dissimilar to themselves.

Studies and research
In a recent study, the research team discovered that reminding Palestinians of their own death through subconscious means inspired conscious shifts in opinion towards wanting to become suicide bombers. This subconscious death reminder inspired the subjects to act aggressively against differing others, even at the risk of losing their own lives. Terror is the result of deep psychological forces; the research described in Flight from Death suggests that these forces can be explained, yielding information about personal anxiety and the motivation of social violence.

Accolades

 Beverly Hills Film Festival - Audience Choice Award for Best Documentary (2003)
Ohio Independent Film Festival - Best Documentary (2003)
 Silver Lake Film Festival - Best Documentary (2003)
Malibu Film Festival - Best Documentary (2004)
Northern Lights Documentary Film Festival - Best Documentary (2004)
 Northwest Film Forum - Best Documentary (2004)
 Rhode Island International Film Festival - Best Documentary (2004)

See also
 The Denial of Death
 Angel of Grief

References

External links
 Official website
 

2003 television films
2003 films
American documentary films
Documentary films about death
2000s English-language films
2000s American films